Hasan Ahmed is an Indian politician belonging to INC. He was elected twice as an M.L.A. from Mustafabad constituency in Delhi, defeating Yogender Kumar Sharma (BJP) by 983 votes in 2008 and Jagdish Pradhan (BJP) by 1,896 votes in 2013. He lost to Jagdish Pradhan in 2015 by 6031 votes.
Ahmed was born in small town of Uttar Pradesh in Rasoolpur Dhaulri.

Political career
Hasan Ahmed was elected for the Fourth Legislative Assembly of Delhi in 2008, defeating Yogender Kumar Sharma (BJP) by 983 votes. In 2013, he was elected again for the Fifth Legislative Assembly of Delhi by defeating Jagdish Pradhan (BJP) by 1,896 votes.

Position held

Elections contested

Delhi Legislative Assembly

Attack on Hasan Ahmed during Press Conference at Lucknow 
Once Hasan Ahmed went to attend a press conference in Lucknow. Suddenly 15-20 youths entered the hotel premises, where Hasan Ahmed was attending press conference and he was allegedly attacked by that group of youths. Later on, one of the attackers who was named Naqi said he is here to talk against Kalbe Jawwad (s Shia cleric), that is why we attacked him. Hasan Ahmed filed a FIR against all of them after the whole incident.

References

 2008 Election Affidavit
 2013 Election Affidavit
 2015 Election Affidavit

Delhi MLAs 2008–2013
Living people
Indian National Congress politicians from Delhi
Delhi MLAs 2013–2015
People from North East Delhi district
Year of birth missing (living people)